The Midrash on Lamentations or Eichah Rabbah (Hebrew: איכה רבה) is a midrashic commentary to the Book of Lamentations ("Eichah").

It is one of the oldest works of midrash, along with Bereshit Rabbah and the Pesiḳta ascribed to Rab Kahana.

Names
The midrash is quoted, perhaps for the first time, by R. Hananeel under the name "Aggadat Eichah." Many passages are quoted by R. Nathan, who invariably calls the work "Megillat Eichah." The term "Eichah Rabbati," which is general even now, is used to designate the many extracts in Yalkut Shimoni which have been included with the other Biblical books. In Eichah Rabbah itself the sources are almost always missing. The names "Midrash Eichah," "Midrash Kinot," "Megillat Kinot," are also found in the old authors. In Yalkut Shimoni there are likewise long extracts from a Midrash on Lamentations published under the name "Midrash Zutta".

Contents
The work begins with 36 consecutive proems forming a separate collection, certainly made by the author of the Midrash. They constitute more than one quarter of the work These proems and, perhaps, most of the annotations, which are arranged in the sequence of the verses, originated in the discourses of which, in olden times, the Book of Lamentations had been the subject. The aggadic explanation of this book—which is a dirge on the destruction of the first and second Temples in Jerusalem and the national destruction that came along with it—was treated by scholars as especially appropriate to the Ninth of Av, to the day of the destruction of the Temple, and to the evening before Tisha BeAv.

The Proems 
The sources from which Yerushalmi drew must have been accessible to the author of Eichah Rabbah, which was certainly edited some time after the completion of the former, and which probably borrowed from it. In the same way older collections must have served as the common source for Eichah Rabbah, Bereshit Rabbah, and especially for the Pesiḳta de-Rab Kahana.  The aggadic comment on Hosea 6:7 appears earlier as a proem to a discourse on Lamentations, and is included among the proems in this Midrash as a comment on Genesis 3:9. The close of this proem, which serves as a connecting link with Lamentations 1:1, is found also in the Pesiḳta as the first proem to pericope 15 (p. 119a) to Isaiah 1:21, the Hafṭarah for the Sabbath before the Ninth of Ab.

The same is the case with the second and fourth proems in the Pesiḳta, which are identical with the fourth and third (according to the correct enumeration) of the proems to Eichah Rabbah; the fifth in the Pesiḳta (120b-121b), which corresponds to the second in this Midrash, has a defective ending. With a change in the final sentences, the first proem in Eichah Rabbah is used as a proem in the Pesiḳta pericope 11 (110a), and with a change of the proem text and of its close, proem 10 (9) of Eichah Rabbah is found as a proem in the Pesiḳta pericope 19 (137b).

On the other hand, there is found embodied in the exposition of Lamentations 1:2, "she weepeth sore in the night," etc., a whole proem, the text of which is Psalms 78:7 et seq., "I remember my lute-playing in the night," etc.; this proem contains also the final sentence which serves as introduction to the section Isaiah 49:14, and it is known from the Pesiḳta pericope 17 to be a proem to a discourse on this section, which is intended for the second "consolatory Sabbath" after the Ninth of Av. From this, it becomes evident that the collector of the Eichah Rabbah used the aggadic exposition—found in the Pesiḳta fulfilling its original purpose—as a comment on Lamentations 1:2. The same is true of the commentary to Lamentations 1:21 for which there was used a proem on the Pesiḳta section Isaiah 51:12, intended originally for the fourth Sabbath after the Ninth of Av, and a section which had for its text this verse of Lamentations (pericope 19, p. 138a); and also in regard to the comment to Lamentations 3:39, which consists of a proem of the Pesiḳta pericope 18 (p. 130b).

But the author also added four proems from Eichah Rabbah itself (29, 18, 19, 31, according to the correct enumeration), retaining the introductory formula ר ... פתח, as a commentary to Lamentations 3:1,14,15; 4:12. The opinion set forth in the introduction to Buber's critical edition that the arrangement of the proems at the beginning of the work was made by a later editor, who included the marked comments of the Midrash as proems, and who, after prefixing the introductory formula to a comment on the Midrash Ḳohelet 12:1 et seq., used it as a proem for Eichah Rabbah 24 (23), is entirely wrong. There can be no doubt that precisely the opposite process has taken place. The entire interpretation in Ecclesiastes Rabbah 12:1-7, which consists of two versions, is composed of two proems—that in Vayikra Rabbah and the proem in this Midrash. The numberless proems originating in the synagogal discourses of the earliest times must be regarded as the richest source upon which the collectors of the midrashim could draw.

Running commentary and stories 

In the part of Eichah Rabbah which contains the running commentary to the Book of Lamentations, the character of interpretation is on the whole the same as in Bereshit Rabbah. Side by side with the simple interpretation of sentences and words, and with various midrashic explanations dating from different authors (whose comments are placed in juxtaposition), the Midrash contains aggadic passages having some sort of relation to the verse. For example, in connection with the words "at the beginning of the watches" (Lamentations 2:19) is introduced the whole discussion of Yerushalmi on the statement of the Mishnah, "to the end of the first watch"; in connection with the words "let us lift up our heart with our hands to God in heaven" (3:41) is introduced a story from Yerushalmi Taanit 65a, telling how R. Abba bar Zabda preached on this verse during a fast-day service.

It is not strange that for similar expressions, such as "en lo . . ." and "lo matz'ah manoah" occurring in Lam. 1:2, 3, and Genesis 8:9, 11:30, Eichah Rabbah uses the explanations of Bereishit Rabbah 38 and 33,end; or that in the Eichah Rabbah the same aggadah is found three times (to explain the three passages Lamentations 1:1, 2:4, and 2:5, in each of which the word "like" occurs; or that the same comment is applied to 3:53 and 3:56; or that a sentence of R. Simeon b. Laḳish is used five times; or that the explanation for reversing the order and putting the letter פ before ע is given twice.

Eichah Rabbah comments on every verse in Lamentations, except a few verses in chapter 3. To some verses (2:20, 3:51, 4:13,18,19) are added the stories to which they were referred, even though they are also found in the large collections on 2:2 and 1:16: "For these things I weep; mine eye, mine eye runneth down with water." These collections, as well as the long passage on 1:5 ("her enemies prosper"), giving so many accounts of the sufferings of Israel, including the times of the First and Second Temples and the fateful Bar Kochba revolt, are the most impressive in Eichah Rabbah; they form an integral part of the work, like the interesting sagas and stories to Lamentations 1:1 on the greatness of the city of Jerusalem and the intelligence of her inhabitants.

Jerusalem and Athens are contrasted in ten stories. The Scriptural words "the populous city, the city great among the nations," are vividly interpreted in the Midrash as meaning "great in intelligence." In connection with "the sons of Zion, the splendid ones" (4:2), the Midrash tells of social and domestic customs. The stories of Eichah Rabbah fill over fifteen columns of the Venice edition (about eleven in the first chapter), and include more than one-fourth of the midrashic comments (without the proems). Without these stories the differences in size of the several chapters would have been less apparent, even if (as was perhaps the case) the first chapter, in the form in which the author knew it, offered more opportunity for comments than did the other chapters.

From this, Zunz erroneously concluded that "the last sections were added later"; and, furthermore, "that the completion of the whole work must not be placed before the second half of the seventh century," because Zunz concludes that the empire of the Arabians is referred to even in a passage of the first chapter. However, according to a reading of S. Buber's edition (which is the only correct one as shown by the context), Seir, not Ishmael, is mentioned in connection with Edom in this passage to 1:14. Zunz' other arguments likewise fail to prove such a late date for the Midrash, especially since Zunz himself concludes that the authorities mentioned therein by name are not later than Yerushalmi. All that can be definitely stated is that Eichah Rabbah was edited after the completion of the Yerushalmi, and that Bereshit Rabbah must also be considered as of earlier date, not so much because it was drawn upon, as because of the character of the proem collection in Eichah Rabbah. Like Bereshit Rabbah, Eichah Rabbah is of Judean origin, and rich in foreign words, especially Greek.

It certainly is not strange that the "Vive domine imperator!" with which R. Johanan b. Zakkai is said to have approached Vespasian in his camp, should have been reproduced. The same phrase was likewise transmitted in Aramaic and Hebrew form, in Buber's edition and in the Arukh.

References

Jewish Encyclopedia bibliography 
Earliest editions of the Midrash Eichah in the Midrashim on the Five Megillot, Pesaro, 1519; Constantinople, 1520; in the complete editions of the Rabbot to Pent. and Megillot, Venice, 1545; Cracow, 1587; Salonica, 1594;
Eichah Rabbati, ed. S. Buber, specially valuable for its commentary and introduction, Wilna, 1899: the text differs largely from that of previous editions in being inferior, having at times the character of another recension, whole passages being summarized in some cases; on other MSS. compare Buber, Introduction, pp. 37b et seq.;
Zunz, G. V. pp. 179–181;
J.L. Rapoport, Erek Millin, pp. 252 et seq.,
Weiss, Dor Dor we-Dorshaw, iii. 262 et seq.;
Winter and Wünsche, Die Jüdische Litteratur, i. 543–554;
W. Bacher's work on the Haggadah. See notices of editions and commentaries in Jew. Encyc. iii. 62, s.v. Bereshit Rabbah.

External links 
 Lamentations Rabbah in Hebrew
 Lamentations Rabbah in English translation at the Internet Archive 

Lamentations
Book of Lamentations